First Evangelical United Church of Christ, also known as the Fifth Street Church and German Reformed Church, is a historic United Church of Christ church located at 111 Fifth Street in Aurora, Dearborn County, Indiana. It was originally constructed in 1848 as a Greek Revival style Baptist church.  It was remodeled in 1911 in the Gothic Revival style.  It is a one-story, red brick building measuring 40 feet, 6 inches, wide by 60 feet deep.  It features arched openings and a projecting front tower topped by an octagonal spire. A parish hall was added to the church between 1932 and 1934. It is the oldest church building in Aurora.

It was added to the National Register of Historic Places in 1994.  It is located in the Downtown Aurora Historic District.

References

External links

Owner's website

United Church of Christ churches in Indiana
Churches on the National Register of Historic Places in Indiana
Gothic Revival church buildings in Indiana
Churches completed in 1848
Churches in Dearborn County, Indiana
National Register of Historic Places in Dearborn County, Indiana
1848 establishments in Indiana
Historic district contributing properties in Indiana